Williamsfield High School, or WHS, is a public four-year high school located at 325 Kentucky Avenue in Williamsfield, Illinois, a village of Knox County, Illinois, in the Midwestern United States. WHS is part of Williamsfield Community Unit School District 210, which also includes Williamsfield Middle School, and Williamsfield Elementary School. The campus is located in Williamsfield, Illinois, 20 miles east of Galesburg, Illinois, and serves a mixed village and rural residential community. The school is in the Galesburg micropolitan statistical area which includes all of Knox and Warren counties.

Academics
Williamsfield High School offers courses in the following academic departments:
English
Mathematics
Science
Social Studies
Health
Foreign Languages
Business
Family and Consumer Science
Agriculture
Driver Education
Art
Music
Physical Education
Learning Disabilities
Galesburg Area Vocational Center

Athletics
Williamsfield High School competes in the Inter County Athletic Conference and is a member school in the Illinois High School Association. Its mascot is the Bomber. The school has no state championships on record in team athletics and activities. They formed a cooperative agreement with nearby Galva High School for boys football in 2009-2010.

References

 Interactive Illinois Report Card

External links
 Williamsfield High School
 Williamsfield Community Unit School District #210

Public high schools in Illinois
Schools in Knox County, Illinois